Shuanglong may refer to:

 Shuanglong Cave, in Zhejiang, China
 Shuanglong Station, the name of several stations in China

Towns and Townships
 Shuanglong, Hunan, a town in Huayuan County, Hunan
 Shuanglong, Chongqing, a town in Changshou District of Chongqing